is a station on the Yurikamome Line in Kōtō, Tokyo, Japan. The station is numbered "U-14".

Lines

Station layout
The station consists of an elevated island platform serving two tracks.

Platforms

History
The station opened on 27 March 2006.

Passenger statistics
In fiscal 2012, the station was used by an average of 83 passengers daily.

Surrounding area
 Toyosu Market

See also
 List of railway stations in Japan

References

External links
Official information site

Railway stations in Tokyo
Railway stations in Japan opened in 2006
Yurikamome